Bobbie Allen may refer to:

 Bobbie Allen, English horsewoman and hotelier
 Bobbie Allen, American runner and winner of the first Richmond Marathon
 Bobbie Allen, American singer-songwriter known as Young Summer

See also
Robert Allen (disambiguation)